Ayanda Nkosi (born 23 January 1993) is a South African footballer who plays for Northern Cape ABC Motsepe side Upington City F.C. He played for Free State Stars.

Career
Ayanda Nkosi has played in the University of Joburg's residence leagues.
Maritzburg United F.C. proclaimed his release in 2016 by mutual consent.

Prior to the  2016-17 South African Premier Division, Nkosi signed a three-year deal to play for Orlando Pirates FC.
Early in his Orlando Pirates career, he was said to have been involved in a tavern brawl.

Nkosi scored his first goal for Orlando Pirates FC in a 2-1 loss to Maritzburg United F.C. As a substitute for Orlando Pirates FC, he was fighting for a starting berth in the club – he said: "Competition is a part of football. In football there is competition whether you like it or not...."

References

External links

South African soccer players
Maritzburg United F.C. players
Orlando Pirates F.C. players
Free State Stars F.C. players
Jomo Cosmos F.C. players
South African Premier Division players
National First Division players
Living people
1993 births
Association football forwards